Brian Turner (23 July 1936 – January 1999) was an English professional footballer who played as a wing half in the Football League. He made more than 450 appearances for Bury, and also appeared for Oldham Athletic.

References

1936 births
1999 deaths
English footballers
Footballers from Salford
Association football wing halves
Bury F.C. players
Oldham Athletic A.F.C. players
Droylsden F.C. players
English Football League players